Alone in My Room may refer to:
 (Alone) In My Room", Verdelle Smith, 1966
 "Alone in My Room" (Ami Suzuki song), 1998
 "Alone in My Room" (Skin song), 2003